William Goodman may refer to:

 Billy Goodman (1926–1984), baseball infielder
 William Ernest Goodman (1879–1949), American cricketer
 William Meigh Goodman, British colonial judge
 William E. Goodman (1838–1912), American soldier in the American Civil War
 William O. Goodman (1848–1936), American lumber tycoon
 Sir W. G. T. Goodman (William George Toop Goodman, 1872–1961), tramways engineer in South Australia

See also
 Goodman (disambiguation)
 Goodman (surname)